"Flamingo" (1940) is a popular song and jazz standard written by Ted Grouya with lyrics by Edmund Anderson and first recorded by singer Herb Jeffries and the Duke Ellington Orchestra on December 28, 1940, for Victor Records (catalog No. 27326B). This briefly reached the Billboard charts in 1941.

Versions that charted in the U.S.
Duke Ellington and his Famous Orchestra, vocal refrain by Herb Jeffries. Victor 27326. Charted number 13 in 1941.
Earl Bostic and his Orchestra. King 4475. Charted number 1, R&B in 1951.
The Gaylords (American vocal group). As "Flamingo L'Amore." Mercury 71369. Charted number 98, Pop in 1958.
Little Willie John. King 5503. Charted number 17, R&B in 1961.
Herb Alpert & the Tijuana Brass. A&M 813. Charted number 28, Pop and number 5, Easy Listening in 1966.

Other notable versions
Bob Crosby and His Orchestra - recorded for Decca Records (catalog No. 3752A) on March 28, 1941.
Tony Martin - recorded for Decca Records (catalog No. 3857A) on May 29, 1941.
Jimmie Lunceford and His Orchestra (vocal by Dan Grissom) - recorded for Decca Records (catalog No. 3931A) on June 23, 1941.
Arild Andresen, piano with guitar and bass recorded it in Oslo on March 11, 1955 as the third melody of the medley "Klaver-Cocktail Nr. 3" along with "Sophisticated Lady" and "With a Song in My Heart". The medley was released on the 78 rpm record His Master's Voice A.L. 3514.
Bobby Jaspar with Blossom Dearie at the piano recorded at the Barclay EP No. 74 017 in Paris (1956) 
Caterina Valente - for her album Plenty Valente! (1957).
Charles Mingus on the album Tijuana Moods (1957)
Jimmy Smith on the Blue Note album The Sermon (1958)
Vic Damone - for his album Strange Enchantment (1962).
Italian singer Mina recorded it on her album "Baby Gate" in 1974.
Nappy Brown on his album Something Gonna Jump Out the Bushes in 1987
 Michel Petrucciani & Stéphane Grappelli (1995) - Dreyfus Records

External links
"Flamingo" at Jazz Standards

References

1940 songs
1940s jazz standards
Herb Alpert songs
Carmen McRae songs
Caterina Valente songs